Taldyk Pass is an all year round pass in the Alay Mountains of Osh Region of Kyrgyzstan. The road from Osh to Khorugh (eastern Tajikistan) was built through the pass in 1930–1932. There is a monument to the memory of the construction manager Yuri M.Grushko located at the pass. The pass is traversed by European route E007 and route M41.

References

Mountain passes of Kyrgyzstan